Adda Fras was a Welsh poet and writer of prophecies. Though he is mentioned in a number of texts, little of his own work survives. In Dafydd ap Gwilym a'i gyfoeswyr 156, he is associated with Casnodyn. He is buried in Maenan Abbey, near Conwy.

References 

13th-century Welsh poets
14th-century Welsh poets
1240 births
1320 deaths